A Postcard from the Day is the second live album (and most recent release) by the Washington, D.C. band The Slickee Boys (Dacoit Records, catalog #2006-1). The album, compiled by guitarist Marshall Keith, collects recordings from 1980 to 1982, taken from shows in Maryland, Virginia, D.C., and New York City.

Track listing
"Life of the Party" – 3:48 (Mark Noone)
"Cinderella" – 2:23 (Gerry Roslie)
Originally recorded by The Sonics, 
"Porcelain Butter Kitten" – 2:41 (Kim Kane)
"Can't Believe" – 3:46 (Marshall Keith, Noone)
"Disconnected" – 2:45 (Noone, J. Charney)
"Goin' All the Way/Glendora" – 4:09 (Mike Bouyea/Ray Stanley)
"Goin' All the Way" originally recorded by The Squires, 1966
"Glendora" originally recorded by Perry Como, 1956; also recorded by the Downliners Sect, 1966
"Jailbait Janet" – 2:15 (Kenne Highland)
Originally recorded by The Afrika Korps, 1977
"Henry VIII" – 1:52 (Fred Murray, Robert Weston)
Popular recording by Herman's Hermits, 1965
"Hiccupped to Hell" – 2:13 (Ersel Wank)
Originally by the Wanktones
"Ain't Gettin' Any" – 3:27 (Robert Hudson, John Ford)
Originally recorded by The Monks
"Louise/Control" – 4:27 (Jesse Lee Kincaid/Howard Weulfing)
"Louise" originally recorded by Paul Revere and the Raiders, 1966
"Stepping Stone" – 3:39 (Tommy Boyce, Bobby Hart)
Originally recorded by Paul Revere and the Raiders, 1966; also recorded by The Monkees, 1966
"Mean Screen" – 2:16 (Scott Duhamel, Eddie Flowers, Highland)
Originally recorded by The Gizmos, 1976
"Somebody's Gonna Get Their Head Kicked in Tonite" – 1:40 (Jeremy Spencer)
Originally recorded by Fleetwood Mac (as Earl Vince and The Valiants), 1969; also recorded by The Rezillos, 1978
"Pictures of Matchstick Men" – 2:38 (Francis Rossi)
Originally recorded by the Status Quo, 1968
"A Question of Temperature" – 3:29 (Mike Appel, Ed Schnug, Don Henny)
Originally recorded by The Balloon Farm, 1967
"Riddles and Fairytales" – 2:17 (Tony Camp, Brian Cooke)
Originally recorded by Bohemian Vendetta, 1968
"Reverse Psychiatry" – 3:34 (Keith, Noone, Emery Olexa)
"The Crawling Hand" – 2:45 (Keith)
"Nagasaki Neuter" – 3:11 (Kane, Keith)
"Weasel" (WHFS commercial) – :26
"When We Were Kids" – 2:54 (Noone)
"Gotta Tell Me Why" – 4:35 (Noone)
"Here to Stay" – 3:49 (Noone)

Personnel

The band
Kim Kane – Rhythm guitar
Marshall Keith – Lead guitar
Mark Noone – Lead vocals
Dan Palenski – Drums

Additional musicians
John Hansen – Lead vocals ("Stepping Stone")

Production
Seth Martin – Soundman
John Chumbris – Soundman

Additional credits
John Hansen – Stage dude
Tom Shea – Stage dude, cover photo, collage of photos
Marshall Keith – CD design
Cathy Gatlin – Collage of photos
Carol Albert – Slickette
Kathleen Sheedy – Slickette
"Thanks for setting the spark on this project: Jim Moon; for cassettes: Robbie White, Tom Shea, Kay Pauley; for carting us all over the East Coast: Tom Shea, Allen Atkinson; for paving the way: Razz; for keeping us going all those years: our great fans"
Recorded at:
The Psychedelly, Bethesda, Maryland ("Goin' All the Way/Glendora", "Stepping Stone", "Mean Screen", "Reverse Psychiatry", "When We Were Kids")
The Elbow Room, Harrisonburg, Virginia ("Disconnected", "Riddles and Fairytales", "Gotta Tell Me Why", "Here to Stay")
Desperados, Georgetown, Washington, D.C. ("Life of the Party", "The Crawling Hand")
The Cellar Door, Georgetown ("Cinderella", "Porcelain Butter Kitten", "Can't Believe", "Hiccupped to Hell", "Ain't Gettin' Any", "Louise/Control")
The Bayou, Georgetown ("Somebody's Gonna Get Their Head Kicked in Tonite", "Pictures of Matchstick Men", "A Question of Temperature")
Columbia Station, Adams Morgan, Washington, D.C. ("Nagasaki Neuter")
CBGB, New York City ("Jailbait Janet", "Henry VIII")

2006 live albums
The Slickee Boys albums